Amyt Datta (born 20 October 1960) is a guitarist, and producer from Kolkata. He toured extensively with the rock band Shiva from the mid-1980s to the early 1990s. He later played with Pinknoise, the late-night alter ego to pop/rock band Skinny Alley in the early 2000s   and has continued his own solo work, often in collaboration with Jivraj Singh of Parekh & Singh. His most recent album The Red Plant was released on 10th December, 2021.

Early life

His father was an educationist and his mother belonged to a family with a strong musical tradition. Amyt's maternal grandfather Raichand Boral is regarded as the father of Bollywood music.

He and his cousin started playing the guitar when they found a lap steel guitar lying around in their home. They started taking guitar lessons which were mostly in Indian classical and semi-classical music. He started taking western music theory lessons from the legendary Carlton Kitto. His first guitar was what he calls "the Trunk". It was made by his friend who took just Rs. 300 from him. It looked like a log and had a very high action.

Discography
D for Brother 1992
Escape the Roar, SKINNY ALLEY,2003
Songs from the Moony Boom, SKINNY ALLEY, 2008
Quirkwork, PINKNOISE, 2009
PINKFRAUD, PINKNOISE, 2009
The Dance of the Diaspora, PINKNOISE, 2009–2010
Electropink, PINKNOISE, 2010
Ambiance de Danse, solo, 2013
Pietra Dura, solo, 2016
Amino Acid", solo, 2016
Roja Planta, solo, 2021

Movie career
In 2011, Amyt Datta appeared as a guitarist in a Bengali rock musical movie Ranjana Ami Ar Ashbona directed by Anjan Dutt. In 2019, he appeared in If Not for You'', a documentary about Kolkata's long lasting love affair with legendary singer-songwriter Bob Dylan.

References

External links 
PINKNOISE
Bound by fret, friendship : Jayashree Singh and Amyt Dutta
A conversation with Amyt Datta By Anant Shrivastava
Tales of the Blue-Eyed Boy: An Interview with Amyt Dutta By Priyanka Roy
India's Best Axe-Men, RollingStone, India.
Article on Merinews

TimeOut Mumbai Article
Indiecision Interview
Screen India Article
Kolkata Newsline Article on Jayashree Singh

Lead guitarists
Indian guitarists
Living people
1960 births
Musicians from Kolkata